Joshua Murphy (born 24 February 1995) is an English professional footballer who plays as a winger for  club Oxford United. He began his career at Norwich City, for whom he scored on his professional debut for in a League Cup match against Watford, and later played for Cardiff City.

Club career

Norwich City
Murphy, along with his twin brother, Jacob, first played football together from the age of seven and eventually, they both joined Norwich City as an under-12 in 2006. It was announced on 31 March 2011, that Josh and his twin brother Jacob joined the club's academy ahead of a new season.

2012–13 season
Murphy's first involvement in the Norwich first-team came on 26 September 2012 when he was named as an unused substitute in the club's 1–0 Football League Cup victory over Doncaster Rovers. He was a part of the Norwich City youth team who won the 2012–13 FA Youth Cup where he scored in the final against Chelsea. Murphy signed his first professional contract for Norwich City alongside his twin brother Jacob on 4 January 2013.

2013–14 season
He made his professional debut on 24 September 2013, replacing Bradley Johnson in the 67th minute of Norwich's Football League Cup match against Watford, with Norwich 2–0 down. He scored his first professional goal in the 77th minute to pull the score back to 2–1. Norwich eventually went on to win 3–2 in extra time. He made his league debut on 2 November 2013 as a half-time substitute for Steven Whittaker in Norwich's 7–0 league defeat against Manchester City. Then, in December 2013, both Josh and Jacob both signed a three-year contract with the club.

His first senior start was in the FA Cup for Norwich City against Fulham. He set up the first goal and was eventually substituted for his brother Jacob Murphy. In 2014, Josh was awarded Professional of the Year in the West Norfolk Sports Awards, as well as the special achievement award. Soon under management of Neil Adams, Josh had a long run in the first team, making appearance for Norwich City.

2014–15 season
Following Norwich City's relegation to the Championship, Murphy made his first start of the 2014–15 season, where he played 90 minutes and scored twice, which his twin brother Jacob provided one of the two goals Josh scored, in a 3–1 win over Crawley Town in the second round of the League Cup. Murphy's first league goal game in a 3–1 win for Norwich over Blackpool on 27 September 2014.

Wigan Athletic (loan)
With his first team opportunities limited, Murphy joined Championship club Wigan Athletic on a month's loan. Murphy made his Wigan Athletic debut, coming on as a substitute for Jermaine Pennant in the 55th minute, in a 2–0 loss against Watford on 17 March 2015. Murphy's five appearances at Wigan Athletic soon earned a loan extension until the end of the season. However, Murphy was unable to help Wigan Athletic survive relegation and returned to his parent club.

2015–16 season

Milton Keynes Dons (loan)

On 21 August 2015, Murphy joined Championship club Milton Keynes Dons on a season-long loan. He scored the winning goal on his debut in a 2–1 win over Cardiff City in the League Cup 2nd Round. On 26 September 2015, Murphy scored his first league goal in the 1–3 home defeat to Derby County.

On 3 May 2016, Murphy was named Milton Keynes Dons Players' Player of the Year 2015–16. In total, Murphy made 46 appearances for the club, scoring 7 goals in all competitions. Murphy finished the season as the Dons' joint top goalscorer and achieved the most assists.

Cardiff City

On 12 June 2018, Murphy joined Premier League side Cardiff City on a 4-year contract for an undisclosed fee, believed to be around £11 million. He made his debut for the club on the opening day of the 2018–19 season as a substitute in place of Nathaniel Mendez-Laing during a 2–0 defeat to AFC Bournemouth. Following a short spell on the sidelines, Murphy scored his first Cardiff goal against Burnley, followed by his second in 4–2 win over Fulham. On June 10, 2022, Cardiff announced Murphy would leave the club when his contract expired on June 30.

Oxford United
On 26 July 2022, Murphy signed a two-year deal with League One side Oxford United.

International career
Both Josh and Jacob were called up by the England U18 in October 2012 and made their U18's debut in a 1–0 win over Finland U19 on 13 November 2012.

Then in early 2013, Both Josh and Jacob were called up by England U19 and their U19's debut in a 3–1 win over Denmark U19. Then on 14 November 2013, Josh scored his first England U19 goal in a 4–1 win over Hungary U19.

In late 2014, Josh was called by England U20 and scored on his debut on 5 September 2014, in a 6–0 win over Romania U20.

Personal life
Murphy was born in Wembley, London. He is of Irish descent.

He is the twin brother of professional footballer Jacob Murphy. The twins spoke about their close bonds and being there for each other. Their parents and younger brother live in Downham Market and run the Arbuckles restaurant.

While on the pitch, former manager Chris Hughton instructed the twins to wear different coloured boots so that he could tell them apart. His uncle is former Ipswich Town footballer Tommy Parkin.

Career statistics

Honours
Individual
Milton Keynes Dons Player's Player of the Year: 2015–16

References

External links

Josh Murphy profile at the Norwich City F.C. website
Josh Murphy profile at the Football Association website

1995 births
Living people
Footballers from Wembley
English footballers
England youth international footballers
English people of Irish descent
Association football wingers
Cardiff City F.C. players
Norwich City F.C. players
Wigan Athletic F.C. players
Milton Keynes Dons F.C. players
Oxford United F.C. players
Premier League players
English Football League players
Twin sportspeople
English twins
Black British sportsmen